Remigio Morales Bermúdez (30 September 1836 – 1 April 1894) served as the 28th President of Peru from 1890 to 1894. He died while still in office. He served as the first vice president from 1886 to 1890. 

His future grandson, whom he would never live to see, Francisco Morales-Bermúdez, became president of Peru from 1975 to 1980.

References

1836 births
1894 deaths
Peruvian people of Spanish descent
Presidents of Peru
Vice presidents of Peru
Constitutional Party (Peru) politicians
Remigio